The Berleburg Bible (Berleburger Bibel) is a German translation of the Bible with copious commentary in eight volumes, compiled in Bad Berleburg during 1726–1742.
It is an original translation from the Hebrew and Greek, along with the  Piscator-Bibel (1602–1604) among the first German translations independent of Luther's Bible.

It was the project of pietistic theologian Johann Friedrich Haug (1680–1753), his brother Johann Jacob Haug (1690–1756) and Berleburg pastor Ludwig Christof Schefer (1669–1731).
The brothers Haug had moved to Sayn-Wittgenstein-Berleburg in 1720, at the time a center of radical pietism.

The biblical commentary has the aim of explaining "the inner state of spiritual life, or the ways and actions of God inside the souls towards their purification, enlightenment and unification with Him" influenced by earlier (17th-century) German mysticism and by the Philadelphians.

The Berleburg Bible was well received in 18th-century pietism, but its long-term influence remained comparatively minor due to its bulk, which imposed "natural limits" on its distribution. 
A reprint was published in Stuttgart in 1856. A second edition was planned but never completed.

References

 Friedrich Wilhelm Winckel: "Die Berleburger Bibel" in: Monatsschrift für die evangelische Kirche der Rheinprovinz und Westphalens  (1851), 18.1,  1–33; 18.2, 59–68.
 Martin Hofmann: Theologie und Exegese der Berleburger Bibel (Beiträge zur Förderung Christlicher Theologie, Bd. 39, 2). Gütersloh 1937.
 Josef Urlinger: Die geistes- und sprachgeschichtliche Bedeutung der Berleburger Bibel. Ein Beitrag zur Wirkungsgeschichte des Quietismus in Deutschland. Diss. Saarbrücken 1969.
 Martin Brecht: "Die Berleburger Bibel. Hinweise zu ihrem Verständnis". In: Pietismus und Neuzeit 8 (1982),  162–200.
 Daniela Deborah Kreher: La Biblia de Berleburg y el contexto que le dio origen en Alemania en el siglo XVIII.  Istituto Universitario ISEDET, Buenos Aires 2007.
 Ulf Lückel: „Die Berleburger Bibel – von Wittgenstein nach Afrika“. In: Wittgenstein. Blätter des Wittgensteiner Heimatvereins e.V. 96 (2008),  72.2, 34–43.

Radical Pietism
Bible translations into German
Siegen-Wittgenstein
1742 books